Alain R. Gabriel Côté (born April 14, 1967) is a Canadian former professional ice hockey player and Roller Hockey player.

Early life
Côté was born in Montmagny, Quebec. As a youth, he played in the 1979 and 1980 Quebec International Pee-Wee Hockey Tournaments with a minor ice hockey team from Montmagny.

Career 
Côté was drafted in the second round (31st overall) by the Boston Bruins in the 1985 NHL Entry Draft. His first season in the National Hockey League (NHL) was 1985–86. He played a total of 36 games in his rookie year and had no goals and six assists. Those 32 games marked the most games that he would play in a single NHL season as he spent most of his career playing in the minors and elsewhere.

Côté played for five different NHL clubs during his career. He played for the Boston Bruins (1985–86 to 1988–89), Washington Capitals (1989–90), Montreal Canadiens (1990–91 to 1991–92), Tampa Bay Lightning (1992–93) and Quebec Nordiques (1993–94). During that span, he played a total of 119 games in which he scored 2 goals and 18 assists for 20 points. He also racked up 124 penalty minutes. As well as the NHL, Côté has played in the QMJHL, AHL and IHL. He has also played hockey in Europe and Japan.

In 1996, Côté played 26 games of Roller Hockey for the Oakland Skates. He had 4 goals and 15 assists for 19 points.

Career statistics

References

External links

1967 births
Atlanta Knights players
Baltimore Skipjacks players
Boston Bruins draft picks
Boston Bruins players
Canadian ice hockey defencemen
Cornwall Aces players
Fredericton Canadiens players
French Quebecers
Granby Bisons players
HDD Olimpija Ljubljana players
Ice hockey people from Quebec
Living people
Maine Mariners players
Moncton Golden Flames players
Montreal Canadiens players
Nürnberg Ice Tigers players
Oakland Skates players
People from Montmagny, Quebec
Quebec Nordiques players
Quebec RadioX players
Quebec Rafales players
Quebec Remparts players
San Francisco Spiders players
Tampa Bay Lightning players
Tappara players
Washington Capitals players
Canadian expatriate ice hockey players in Slovenia
Canadian expatriate ice hockey players in Finland
Canadian expatriate ice hockey players in Germany